The 2023 Plateau State gubernatorial election will take place on 18 March 2023, to elect the Governor of Plateau State, concurrent with elections to the Plateau State House of Assembly as well as twenty-seven other gubernatorial elections and elections to all other state houses of assembly. The election—which was postponed from its original 11 March date—will be held three weeks after the presidential election and National Assembly elections. Incumbent APC Governor Simon Lalong is term-limited and cannot seek re-election to a third term.

Party primaries were scheduled for between 4 April and 9 June 2022 with the Peoples Democratic Party nominating Caleb Mutfwang—former Mangu Local Government Chairman—on 25 May while the All Progressives Congress nominated Nentawe Yilwatda on 26 May. In August, former commissioner Patrick Dakum—a withdrawn aspirant in the APC primary—won the nomination of the Labour Party in a rerun primary.

Electoral system
The Governor of Plateau State is elected using a modified two-round system. To be elected in the first round, a candidate must receive the plurality of the vote and over 25% of the vote in at least two-thirds of state local government areas. If no candidate passes this threshold, a second round will be held between the top candidate and the next candidate to have received a plurality of votes in the highest number of local government areas.

Background
Plateau State is a diverse, agriculture-based state in the North Central; although it has vast natural resources, Plateau has faced issues in security as inter-ethnic violence and conflict between herders and farmers heavily affect the state. The overproliferation of weaponry and increased pressure for land along with failures in governance led to the worsening of these clashes in the years ahead of the election.

Politically, Plateau's 2019 elections were a mixed bag for both major parties. On the federal level, PDP nominee Atiku Abubakar narrowly won the state but it swung slightly towards Buhari; legislatively, the parties fairly evenly split the Senate seats and won House of Representatives seats. Statewise, Lalong won re-election by about 4% of the vote and the APC won a majority in the House of Assembly.

At the beginning of Lalong's second term, he announced that the administration would center its policy on infrastructure development, peace and community security, and sustainable economic growth. In terms of his performance, Lalong was commended for infrastructural development while being criticized for a poor response to increasingly deadly interethnic violence and denying opposition politicians access to government-owned media.

Primary elections
The primaries, along with any potential challenges to primary results, were to take place between 4 April and 3 June 2022 but the deadline was extended to 9 June. An informal zoning gentlemen's agreement sets the Plateau Central Senatorial District may have the next governor as Plateau Central has not held the governorship since 2007. While the PDP has zoned its nomination to the central district, the APC did not zone its nomination; both parties' nominees came from the Central district.

All Progressives Congress 

Ahead of the primary in May 2022, accusations of imposition divided the state APC as eighteen of nineteen gubernatorial candidates accused incumbent Governor Simon Lalong and his inner circle of unduly supporting the nineteenth candidate, former INEC official Nentawe Yilwatda. The protesting aspirants released a statement threatening to collectively leave the APC if the state party leadership allows Lalong "to subjugate the collective will of members of APC by imposing a candidate on members of the party." After that month's ward congresses, further accusations were tabled against Lalong as a group said he hijacked the congresses to get favourable delegates for the state primary. In the days before the primary, most candidates dropped out in protest of the alleged imposition of Yilwatda resulting in a primary with only four candidates. During the primary, even the remaining opponents to Yilwatda staged a walkout as the votes were cast; Yilwatda won with nearly 90% of the delegates' votes. As opposition to his nomination continued, Yilwatda commenced his general election campaign and selected Pam Bot-mang—the Commissioner of Works and son of former Deputy Governor Michael Bot-mang—as his running mate. By July, Yilwatda's internal party opponents sued to disqualify his candidacy.

Nominated 
 Nentawe Yilwatda: former INEC Resident Electoral Commissioner for Benue State
 Running mate—Pam Bot-mang: Commissioner of Works and son of former Deputy Governor Michael Bot-mang

Eliminated in primary 
 David Victor Dimka: former civil servant
 Garba Pwul: a barrister and Senior Advocate of Nigeria
 Sonni Gwanle Tyoden: Deputy Governor (2015–present) and former Vice Chancellor of the University of Jos (2006–2011)

Withdrew 
 Pukat Shehu Barde: former civil servant
 Sunday Biggs: civil servant
 Fitka Bilshakka: surveyor
 Dakas Clement Dakas: barrister
 Patrick Dakum: doctor, CEO of the Institute of Human Virology Nigeria, and former Commissioner for Information
 Shem Yaute Damisa: former state Accountant General
 Hezekiah Ayuba Dimka: Senator for Plateau Central (2019–present)
 Amos Gizo: former House of Representatives member for Kanke/Pankshin/Kanam
 Kizito Dankat Gukas: former civil servant
 Danlami Lenkop: medical doctor
 Yohana Margif: businessman (defected prior to the primary to successfully run in the LP gubernatorial primary)
 Johnson Podar: businessman
 Danyaro Dakon Sarpiya: federal government staffer
 Sipak Shase’et: veterinarian
 Geoffrey Yilleng: former Kanke Local Government Deputy Chairman

Declined 
 Manji Gontori: 2019 APC Plateau Central senatorial candidate
 Danlami Lenkwot: a doctor and former Kanke Local Government Chairman

Results

People's Democratic Party 
In April 2022, Plateau PDP State Executive Committee announced that the party had zoned their gubernatorial nomination to Plateau Central Senatorial District.

On the primary date, four candidates withdrew while the other fourteen candidates continued to an indirect primary at the Langfield Event Centre in Jos that continued into the early morning of 26 May. It resulted in Caleb Mutfwang emerging as nominee after announced results showed Mutfwang winning with over 42% of the delegates' votes. In the weeks after the primary, Mutfwang held reconciliatory meetings with his former opponents with the intent of ensuring party unity. On 21 June, Mutfwang announced Josephine Chundung Piyo—a fellow former Local Government Chairperson—as his running mate at the State Party Secretariat in Jos.

Nominated 
 Caleb Mutfwang: former Mangu Local Government Chairman
Running mate—Josephine Chundung Piyo: former Riyom Local Government Chairwoman and former House of Assembly member

Eliminated in primary 
 Jonathan Sunday Akuno
 Jonathan Aminu: former House of Representatives member for Bokkos/Mangu
 Mazadu Dader Bako: geoscientist
 Shedrack Best: 2019 PDP gubernatorial candidate
 Alfred Dapal: geologist
 Dauda Wuritka Gotring: economist
 Jerry Gushop: agriculturalist
 Bagudu Hirse: 2015 LP gubernatorial nominee and former Minister of State for Foreign Affairs
 Satu Jatau: economist
 Alex Ladan: 2019 ANN gubernatorial nominee
 Timothy Nantong
 David Shikfu Parradang: former Nigeria Immigration Service Comptroller-General and 2019 PDP Plateau Central senatorial nominee
 Dipak Shawarapshaka
 John Sunday Sura: retired Army brigadier general

Withdrew 
 Latep Dabang: former state APC Chairman
 Timothy Golu: former House of Representatives member for Pankshin/Kanke/Kanam (2011–2019) and former House of Assembly member for Kanke
 Vincent Nanle: pastor
 Jack Yakubu Pam

Results

Minor parties 

 Ankara Michael Umaru (Accord)
Running mate: Samuel Nandom
 Yibaikas Amos Adamu (Action Alliance)
Running mate: James Pam Dauda
 Sani Dawop (Action Democratic Party)
Running mate: Isaac Rwang Dalyop
 Aminu Muhammad Hadi (Action Peoples Party)
Running mate: Esther Kachallom Dung
 George Duwa Dimka (African Action Congress)
Running mate: Lucas Emmanuel Nshem
 Solomon Nandy Chendan (African Democratic Congress)
Running mate: Gyang Pam Chollom
 Mohammad Abdullahi Dan Baba (Allied Peoples Movement)
Running mate: Zulaikha Abdullahi Aliyu
 Samuel Abashe (All Progressives Grand Alliance)
Running mate: Rovina Richard Ajiya
 Ibrahim Abdullahi (Boot Party)
Running mate: David Salome
 Patrick Dakum (Labour Party)
Running mate: Edward Gyang Pwajok
 Alfred Dabwam (New Nigeria Peoples Party)
Running mate: Abdullahi G. Ango
 Francis Kwapdimma Ritshak (National Rescue Movement)
Running mate: Daniel David Fom
 Luka Panpe Yakubu (People's Redemption Party)
Running mate: Samson Pam
 Ponyah Ibrahim Binchak (Social Democratic Party)
Running mate: Job Jack Bot
 Butdangman Gontori (Young Progressives Party)
Running mate: Ishaya Chuwang Pam
 Samuel Langen Kompial (Zenith Labour Party)
Running mate: Moses Simi

Campaign
The major parties' nominees spent the months of June and July 2022 focusing on the aftermath of party primaries. While Mutfwang held reconciliatory meetings with his former primary opponents and claimed to have unified the state PDP, the alleged imposition of Yilwatda by Lalong precluded reconciliation efforts within the state APC as losing primary candidates formed a factional forum with other aggrieved party members in late July 'to protest the injustice meted out to them during the party primaries.' As the focus shifted the general election campaign itself, analysts noted potential dynamics including the APC infighting along with the experience of both Mutfwang and Yilwatda in addition to the more prominent minor party nominees—Sani Dawop (ADP), Samuel Abashe (APGA), Patrick Dakum (LP), and Luka Panpe Yakubu (PRP). However, August brought reports of internal crisis in the PDP as rival blocs supportive of either former Governor Jonah Jang or former Senator Jeremiah Useni ratcheted up their dispute amid the national PDP Atiku Abubakar vs. Ezenwo Nyesom Wike crisis. 

By November, analysis focused on the power of the APC's incumbency while also noting ethnic and regional dynamics. The next month, pundits noted continued criticism of Yilwatda due to his alleged primary imposition by Lalong along with allegations that Mutfwang did not pay civil servant salaries during his tenure as local government chairman. In the new year, reporting labeled Dakum as a major candidate due to the rise of the state LP and the conclusion of the legal dispute over the LP nomination. With the election's new framing as a three-way contest, punditry focused on each candidate's strengths and weaknesses: for Dakum, the popularity of Peter Obi—the LP presidential nominee—greatly helped his campaign viability but the party still lacks a substantial overarching structure in the state; for Mutfwang, his grassroots network was reportedly strong but the PDP crises had greatly hurt his campaign; and for Yilwatda, his personality and APC incumbency were categorized as boosts but the party crisis and APC unpopularity worked against him.

Much of the last stretch of campaigning was dominated by attention on the presidential election on 25 February. In the election, Plateau State voted for Peter Obi (LP); Abubakar won the state with 42.9% of the vote, beating Bola Tinubu (APC) at 28.2% and Atiku Abubakar (PDP) at 22.4%. With Obi's performance boosting his chances and a favorable Supreme Court that affirmed his candidacy, Dakum gained momentum in the final weeks of campaigning. At the same time, reports noted the competitiveness of the election and the LP's downballot weakness along with Lalong's own senatorial loss.

Projections

Conduct

Electoral timetable

General election

Results

By senatorial district 
The results of the election by senatorial district.

By federal constituency
The results of the election by federal constituency.

By local government area 
The results of the election by local government area.

See also 
 2023 Nigerian elections
 2023 Nigerian gubernatorial elections

Notes

References 

Plateau State gubernatorial election
2023
2023 Plateau State elections
Plateau